1998 Titius, provisional designation , is a metallic–carbonaceous asteroid from the inner regions of the asteroid belt, approximately 14 kilometers in diameter.

It was discovered on 24 February 1938, by German astronomer Alfred Bohrmann at Heidelberg Observatory in southern Germany. On the same night, the body was also observed at the Finnish Turku Observatory. It was later named after astronomer Johann Daniel Titius.

Orbit and classification 

Titius orbits the Sun in the inner main-belt at a distance of 2.3–2.6 AU once every 3 years and 9 months (1,375 days). Its orbit has an eccentricity of 0.06 and an inclination of 8° with respect to the ecliptic. It stays in a 2:1 orbital resonance with the planet Mars. Titius observation arc starts on the night following its official discovery observation.

Physical characteristics

Diameter and albedo 

According to observations carried out by the Japanese Akari and NASA's Wide-field Infrared Survey Explorer (WISE) with its subsequent NEOWISE mission, Titius has an albedo between 0.093 and 0.126, and its diameter measures between 14.2 and 16.0 kilometers. The Collaborative Asteroid Lightcurve Link assumes a standard albedo of 0.20 and calculates a diameter of 10.8 kilometers with an absolute magnitude of 12.2.

Spectral type 

Its spectral classification is that of a Xc-type asteroid in the SMASS taxonomy, a transitional spectral type between the two large main groups of metallic X-type and carbonaceous C-type asteroids. Both types are much darker than the stony S-type asteroids, which are also very common in the inner main-belt. In addition, Titius is also classified as a M-type asteroid by WISE.

Rotation period 

A rotational lightcurve of Titius was obtained from photometric observations by American astronomer Robert Stephens at the Californian Santana Observatory in March 2002. Lightcurve analysis gave a rotation period of  hours, during which its brightness amplitude varies by  magnitude.

Naming 

This minor planet was named after German astronomer Johann Daniel Titius (1729–1796), best known for formulating the Titius-Bode law, which states that each subsequent planet in the Solar System is roughly twice as far from the Sun than the previous one. He is also honored by the lunar crater Titius. The official  was published by the Minor Planet Center on 15 October 1977.

References

External links 
 Asteroid Lightcurve Database (LCDB), query form (info )
 Dictionary of Minor Planet Names, Google books
 Asteroids and comets rotation curves, CdR – Observatoire de Genève, Raoul Behrend
 Discovery Circumstances: Numbered Minor Planets (1)-(5000) – Minor Planet Center
 
 

001998
Discoveries by Alfred Bohrmann
Named minor planets
001998
19380224